State highway loops in Texas are owned and maintained by the Texas Department of Transportation (TxDOT).

Loop 401

Loop 401 was located in Scurry County. It was designated on August 31, 1964, when US 84 was bypassed around Snyder. The route was signed as a business route of US 84. On June 21, 1990, Loop 401 was cancelled and redesignated Business US 84.

Loop 402

Loop 402 was designated on December 18, 1964, along the old routing of US 80 through Big Spring. The route was signed as US 80 Business rather than Loop 402. On June 21, 1990, Loop 402 was cancelled and redesignated as Business I-20-G.

Loop 403

Loop 403 is located in Parmer County. It runs from US 84 northwest of Lariat to US 84 southeast of Lariat.

Loop 403 was designated on January 26, 1965, on the current route along an old routing of US 84.

Loop 404

Loop 404 is located in Wilbarger County.

Loop 404 was designated on January 26, 1965, on its current route. It is a former alignment of US 287.

Junction list

Loop 405

Loop 405 (1965)

The first use of the Loop 405 designation was in McLennan County, from US 84, west along Valley Mills Drive (former SH 6) and Bosque Boulevard to SH 6. Loop 405 was cancelled on November 12, 1965, and replaced by Spur 396 (now Loop 396).

Loop 405 (1967)

The next use of the Loop 405 designation was in Walker County, from SH 19 northeast of Huntsville southward to I-45. Loop 405 was cancelled on May 21, 1979, and became a portion of SH 19.

Loop 406

Loop 406 was designated on April 1, 1965, from then-new US 90 north along old US 90 across Devils River to US 90. On October 27, 1967, the section from 0.7 mile northwest of US 90 to a point 9.4 miles northwest was removed altogether, the section from the southeast junction with US 90 to a point 0.7 mile northwest was transferred to Spur 454 and the remainder was changed to Spur 406.

Loop 409

Loop 409 was designated on April 1, 1965, along the old route of SH 35 through Alvin. The route was signed as SH 35 Business rather than Loop 409. On June 21, 1990, Loop 409 was cancelled and re-designated as Business SH 35-C.

Loop 410
Loop 410 is a designation that has been used twice. No highway currently uses the Loop 410 designation.

Loop 410 (1960)

The first use of the Loop 410 designation was in Bexar County, from I-10 in northern San Antonio east to I-35 near Fratt, as a renumbering of a section of Loop 13. Loop 410 was cancelled on July 31, 1969, and transferred to I-410.

Loop 410 (1971)

The next use of the Loop 410 designation was in Harris County as a business loop of SH 146 through La Porte. The route was signed as SH 146 Business rather than Loop 410. On July 28, 1977, the section along Avenue J from SH 146 to Broadway was cancelled and Loop 410 was rerouted on a new route to SH 146, replacing a portion of Spur 501 and all of Spur 498. This was also signed as SH 146 Business. Loop 410 was cancelled on June 21, 1990, and transferred to Business SH 146-D.

Loop 411

Loop 411 was the designation of the former route of US 87 through Stockdale. It is now Business US 87.

Loop 415

Loop 415 was designated on September 1, 1965, from US 77/US 83 in Brownsville along an old routing of US 77/US 83 to the Gateway Bridge at Elizabeth and 14th Streets. The route was signed as US 77/US 83 Business rather than Loop 415. On June 21, 1990, Loop 415 was cancelled and transferred to Business US 77-Z.

Loop 416

Loop 416 was located in Hudspeth County. It was the former alignment of US 80 through Sierra Blanca. It is now Business I-10.

Loop 418

Loop 418 was located in Georgetown. It was redesignated Business I-35, portions of which are now Spur 26 and Spur 158.

Loop 419

Loop 419 (1965)

The first use of the Loop 419 designation was in Titus County as a loop off US 271 in Mount Pleasant. The route was signed as US 271 Business rather than Loop 419. On June 21, 1990, Loop 419 was cancelled and transferred to Business US 271-E.

Loop 419 (2007)

The next use of the Loop 419 designation was in Brazoria County as a loop off FM 524 along the old route of SH 35 through Old Ocean. On May 30, 2013, the section from FM 524 to CR 374 was returned to Brazoria County (became CR 374) and the remainder was changed to Spur 419.

Loop 420

Loop 420 was located in Laredo. It was redesignated Business US 83, which is now Business I-35.

Loop 424

Loop 424 is located in San Jacinto County. The highway was designated in 1966 along the old route of US 59 through Shepherd.

Junction list

Loop 425

Loop 425 was designated on January 19, 1966, as a loop off I-20 in Baird along an old routing of US 80. On June 21, 1990, Loop 425 was cancelled and transferred to Business I-20-T.

Loop 426

Loop 426 was designated on January 19, 1966, as a loop off US 377 in Granbury along an old routing of US 377. On June 21, 1990, Loop 426 was cancelled and transferred to Business US 377-H.

Loop 427

Loop 427 was a business route of US 79 in Taylor. It is now designated as Business US 79.

Loop 428

Loop 428 was designated on January 19, 1966, as a loop off US 77 through Bishop and Kingsville along an old routing of US 77. On June 21, 1990, Loop 428 was cancelled and transferred to Business US 77-V.

Loop 429

Loop 429 is located in Grimes County, within the county seat of Anderson. Its southern terminus is at FM 1774. It runs north along Main Street, intersecting Buffington Lane in a traffic circle around the county courthouse, before continuing to its northern terminus at FM 149.

Loop 429 was designated on January 20, 1966, along the current route.

Loop 430

Loop 430 is located in Lamb County. The highway was designated in 1966 along the old route of US 84 through Littlefield.

Junction list

Loop 431

Loop 431 was designated on May 5, 1966, as a loop off US 277 in Eagle Pass. On December 21, 1983, Loop 431 was rerouted over old US 277 along Spur 240 to US 57. Loop 431 was cancelled on June 21, 1990, and transferred to Business US 277-N.

Loop 432

Loop 432 was designated on August 4, 1966, as a loop off I-20 in Sweetwater along an old routing of US 80. The route was signed as US 80 Business rather than Loop 432. On June 21, 1990, Loop 432 was cancelled and transferred to Business I-20-M.

Loop 434

Loop 434 is located in Amarillo. It is the former route of US 87 through the northern part of the city.

Loop 436

Loop 436 was designated on August 31, 1966, as a loop off US 59 around the west side of Carthage. On October 21, 1981, the section from US 59 south to US 79/Loop 334 was transferred to US 79. The remainder of Loop 436 was cancelled on September 25, 1989, and removed from the highway system. The route is now portions of US 79 and SH 149.

Loop 438

Loop 438 is located in Winters.

Loop 438 was designated on October 3, 1966, as a loop off FM 53 along an old routing of FM 53.

Loop 439

Loop 439 was designated on October 3, 1966, as a loop off SH 289 in Prosper along an old routing of SH 289. The route was signed as SH 289 Business rather than Loop 438. On June 21, 1990, Loop 438 was cancelled and transferred to Business SH 289-D.

Loop 441

Loop 441 was located in Grayson County. It was designated on October 3, 1966, as a loop off SH 99 (now US 377) in Whitesboro. The route was signed as a business route of SH 99. On June 21, 1990, Loop 441 was cancelled and transferred to Business US 377.

Loop 442

Loop 442 is located in Tehuacana.

Loop 442 was designated on October 3, 1966, as a loop off SH 171 along an old routing of SH 171. The route was signed as SH 171 Business rather than Loop 442.

Loop 443

Loop 443 was designated on October 3, 1966, from SH 358 east to US 181 in downtown Corpus Christi along an old routing of SH 44. On June 21, 1990, Loop 443 was cancelled and transferred to Business SH 44-D (now Spur 544).

Loop 444

Loop 444 is located in Paradise. Both of its termini are at SH 114.

Loop 444 was designated on October 3, 1966. It is a former alignment of SH 114 in Paradise.

Loop 445

Loop 445 was a loop off US 87 in Plainview. It is now Business I-27.

Loop 446

Loop 446 was designated on April 27, 1967, as a loop off SH 78 in Farmersville along an old routing of SH 78. The route was signed as SH 78 Business rather than Loop 446. On June 21, 1990, Loop 446 was cancelled and transferred to Business SH 78-D.

Loop 448

Loop 448 was designated on June 1, 1967, from US 77 north of Harlingen southeast to US 77/US 83 southeast of San Benito. The route was signed as US 77 Business rather than Loop 448. On July 31, 1969, a section of old US 77 from US 77 north of Raymondville to Spur 56 south of Raymondville was added, creating a gap. This section was also signed as US 77 Business. On September 30, 1974, a section from Spur 56 south to US 77 south of Sebestian was added, shortening the gap. Like the rest of the route, this section was signed as Business US 77. On June 21, 1990, Loop 448 was cancelled: the Raymondville-Sebestian section was transferred to Business US 77-W and the Harlingen-San Benito section was transferred to Business US 77-X.

Loop 451

Loop 451 was designated on September 26, 1967, as a loop off SH 121 in Randolph along an old routing of SH 121. The route was signed as SH 121 Business rather than Loop 451. On June 21, 1990, Loop 451 was cancelled and transferred to Business SH 121-D.

Loop 452

Loop 452 was designated on April 8, 1986, in Gatesville, from SH 36 south 3.4 miles to US 84 and from US 84 southeast 1.1 miles to SH 36, creating a concurrency with US 84. The route was formerly a section of SH 36. On June 21, 1990, Loop 452 was cancelled and transferred to Business SH 36-E.

Loop 453

Loop 453 was designated on October 27, 1967, as a loop off Loop 337 in New Braunfels along an old routing of SH 46. The route was signed as SH 46 Business rather than Loop 453. On June 21, 1990, Loop 453 was cancelled and transferred to Business SH 46-C.

Loop 455

Loop 455 was designated on December 15, 1967, as a loop off US 59 in Carthage along an old routing of US 59. The route was signed as US 59 Business rather than Loop 455. On December 15, 1981, the route was modified to run continuous along city streets. Loop 455 was cancelled on June 21, 1990, and transferred to Business US 59-D.

Loop 456

Loop 456 is located in Cherokee County. Its western terminus is at an intersection with FM 347 (South Bolton Street) south of downtown Jacksonville. The two-lane road goes eastward, then curves toward the northeast while passing the Jacksonville Independent School District's Nichols Intermediate School. Loop 456 has a signalized intersection with US 69 (South Jackson Street) and then intersects FM 768 (Corinth Road). The road continues northeastward to its eastern terminus at a T intersection with SH 204. Here, eastbound SH 204 traffic turns to the east, while westbound SH 204 continues ahead.

Loop 456 was designated on December 16, 1967. A later plan to extend the route from US 79 east of downtown Jacksonville to the north side of the city at US 69 was not implemented or built. In recent years, the Loop 456 intersection at US 69 south was upgraded to a full signalized intersection.

Loop 457

Loop 457 was designated on January 16, 1968, as a loop off SH 24 in Cooper along an old routing of SH 24. The route was signed as SH 24 Business rather than Loop 457. On June 21, 1990, Loop 457 was cancelled and transferred to Business SH 24-D.

Loop 461

Loop 461 is located in New Deal. It is the former alignment of US 87 through the city.

Loop 462

Loop 462 was designated on February 29, 1968, as a loop off SH 24 in Floyd along an old routing of SH 24. The route was signed as SH 24 Business rather than Loop 462. On June 21, 1990, Loop 462 was cancelled and transferred to Business US 380-J.

Loop 463

Loop 464

Loop 464 is located in Ward County. It begins at SH 18 south of Monahans. The route travels along Loop Road to the north and enters the city as it crosses over  I-20; access from the freeway is provided by exit 79. The highway passes between Thorntonville to the west and Roy Hurd Memorial Airport to the east before crossing Business I-20, the former route of US 80 through the city. Loop 464 turns to the northwest and leaves the city limits before resuming a more northerly trajectory and ending at another junction with SH 18.

Loop 464 was designated on April 29, 1968, along the current route. , TxDOT is considering the addition of a ramp along eastbound I-20 at the exit for Loop 464.

Loop 466

Loop 467

Loop 467 is located in Sutton County. Its western terminus is at I-10 exit 399. It runs to the southeast and into Sonora, where it intersects and is briefly concurrent with US 277. After the two routes separate, Loop 467 intersects RM 1691 before turning back to the northeast and leaving Sonora. The route's eastern terminus is at I-10 exit 404, which also provides access to RM 864 and RM 3130.

Loop 467 was designated on June 12, 1968. It is a routing of the former US 290 through Sonora and was originally signed as a business route of US 290.

Loop 472

Loop 472 is located in Lynn County. It is the former route of US 87 through Tahoka.

Loop 473

Loop 475

Loop 475 was designated on March 7, 1969, as a loop off US 377 in Tioga along an old routing of US 377. The route was signed as US 377 Business rather than Loop 475. On June 21, 1990, Loop 475 was cancelled and transferred to Business US 377-D.

Loop 476

Loop 476 was designated on March 7, 1969, as a loop off US 377 in Collinsville along an old routing of US 377. The route was signed as US 377 Business rather than Loop 476. On June 21, 1990, Loop 476 was cancelled and transferred to Business US 377-C.

Loop 477

Loop 477 was designated on March 7, 1969, from US 287 at the Wichita-Wilbarger County line southeast via Electra to US 287 southeast of Electra. The route was signed as US 287 Business rather than Loop 477. On June 21, 1990, was cancelled and transferred to Business US 287-H.

Loop 478

Loop 478 is located in El Paso. Its southern terminus of Loop 478 is at US 62 (East Paisano Drive) in El Paso near the Bridge of the Americas. The route travels north along Copia Street, intersecting SH 20 (Alameda Drive) and crossing under the I-10 freeway at its exit 22A. It then turns northwest onto Pershing Drive and then north on Dyer Street, paralleling US 54 (Patriot Freeway) to its east. At its northern terminus, it curves northward to end at US 54 and Business US 54.

Loop 478 was established on April 2, 1969, from US 54 near the New Mexico state line to the Mexican border along the Rio Grande. The section along old US 54 was marked as Business US 54. On June 21, 1990, the section of Loop 478 east of US 54 was transferred to Business US 54.

Loop 480

Loop 480 forms a partial loop around Eagle Pass. Beginning near the Eagle Pass Camino Real Port of Entry, it runs counterclockwise, crossing FM 1021 and US 277, before ending at US 57 northwest of the city.

Loop 480 was designated on May 29, 2003. The Loop 480 designation extends past the current northern terminus to another intersection with US 277 north of Eagle Pass; however, the this segment has not been constructed.

Loop 480 (1969)

A previous route numbered Loop 480 was designated in Lamar County on May 28, 1969, from US 82 in northern Paris south and southeast  to US 271. It was signed as a business route of US 271. On June 21, 1990, Loop 480 was cancelled and transferred to Business US 271.

Loop 481

Loop 481 is located in Kimble County. The highway was designated in 1969 over the old route of US 83 / US 290 when those highways were re-routed around the town of Junction with the construction of I-10.

The highway begins at an intersection with US 377 (11th Street). The highway travels in an eastern direction along Main Street and passes through the Junction town square. Loop 481 turns in a southeast direction at East Main Street and crosses the South Llano River before leaving the town. The highway has a short overlap with FM 2169 near the Texas Tech University Junction Center. The highway travels through rural areas and hilly terrain before ending at an interchange with I-10 / US 83.

Along with US 377 (North Main Street), Loop 481 forms a business loop of I-10 through Junction.

Junction list

Loop 483

Loop 483 was designated on November 26, 1989, as a loop off SH 289 in Celina along an old routing of SH 289. On June 21, 1990, Loop 483 was cancelled and transferred to Business SH 289-C.

Loop 484

Loop 484 is located in eastern Waco. The  highway serves as a connector between Business US 77 and SH 6. It is mostly unsigned, with the westbound route usually signed as "to Business US 77" and the eastbound route labeled as "to SH 6".

Loop 484 was designated on September 25, 1984, along the current route. It is a former alignment of SH 6.

Loop 485

Loop 485 is located in Gladewater. Its southern terminus is at a junction with US 271. It runs counterclockwise around the southern and eastern portion of the city, crossing US 80, before reaching its northern terminus at another junction with US 271.(in a clockwise direction back to US 271 in Gladewater.

Loop 485 was designated on January 30, 1970, from US 271 eastward and northward to US 80. It was extended to its current northern terminus on November 20, 1973.

Loop 488

Loop 489

Loop 489 was designated on March 31, 1970, as a loop off US 67 in Midlothian along an old routing of US 67. The route was signed as US 67 Business rather than Loop 489. On June 21, 1990, Loop 489 was cancelled and transferred to Business US 67-Q (now Spur 73 and a local route).

Loop 491

Loop 491 was located in Waco. It is now Business US 77.

Loop 493

Loop 493 is located in Lubbock County. It is a former routing of US 87 through the community of Woodrow.

Loop 494

Loop 495

Loop 495 was designated on October 2, 1970, from US 59/US 259 north of Nacogdoches south to US 59/Loop 224 south of Nacogdoches along an old routing of US 59. The route was signed as US 59 Business rather than Loop 495. On June 21, 1990, Loop 495 was cancelled and transferred to Business US 59-F.

Loop 496

Loop 496 was designated on December 17, 1970, from US 81/US 287 south of Avondale to I-820 (now I-20) in Fort Worth along an old routing of US 81/US 287. Portions of the route were signed as US 81 Business and US 287 Business. On November 25, 1975, the road was extended south to FM 157 in Mansfield. On February 6, 1982, the road was extended southeast to US 287. Loop 496 was cancelled on June 21, 1990, and transferred to Business US 287-P.

Loop 497

Loop 497 is located in Austin County. It runs from SH 36 northwest of Kenney to SH 36 southeast of Kenney.

Loop 497 was designated on April 29, 1971, on the current route along an old routing of SH 36.

Loop 497 (1970)

The original Loop 497 was designated on December 17, 1970, from I-45 northeast to US 75 (now SH 75). Loop 497 was returned to the city of Fairfield when I-45 was completed between Fairfield and Streetman.

Loop 498

Loop 498 was designated on November 30, 1978, as a loop off US 96 in Silsbee. On June 21, 1990, Loop 498 was cancelled and transferred to Business US 96-F.

Loop 499

Loop 499 is located in Cameron County. It runs from US 77 north of Harlingen to US 83.

Loop 499 was designated on April 29, 1971, from US 77 east and south to Loop 448 (now Business US 77), but was not officially added until January 31, 1973, as construction had not yet begun. On May 21, 1979, the road was extended southwest to US 83, replacing a section of FM 801.

Notes

References

+4
State highway loops 400
State highway loops 400